Oberstabswachtmeister (short: OStWm) is in the Austrian Bundesheer a NCO-rank. It belongs to the higher Staff-NCO rank group, and is normally dedicated to command a platoon or to serve in a military staff appointment (assignment group M BUO 1 / professional NCO; respectively M ZUO 1 / reserve).

During United Nations missions and in NATO Partnership for Peace the rank Stabswachtmeister will be designated in English with Sergeant First Class (SFC) / Staff Sergeant (SSG) and is equivalent to NATO-Rang code OR-8.

The equivalent to Oberstabswachtmeister might be the Stabsfeldwebel of the Bundeswehr as well.

Rank insignia on the collar patch are a wide and a small white stripe with two sex serrated stars, symbolising the Austrian edelweiss.

See also
 Ranks of the Austrian Bundesheer

References 

 Die Streitkräfte der Republik Österreich, 1918-1968, Heeresgeschichtliches Museum, Militärwissenschaftliches Institut, 1968.

Military ranks of Austria
Austro-Hungarian Army
Military ranks of Germany